The 1921 North Dakota gubernatorial recall election was a recall election of North Dakota Governor Lynn Frazier in 1921. Frazier was the first U.S. governor ever successfully recalled from office; there would not be another successful recall of a governor until California Governor Gray Davis was recalled in 2003.

Background
The recall stemmed from the conflict between the allegedly socialist-leaning Nonpartisan League, of which Governor Frazier was a member, and the Independent Voters Association, a conservative and pro-market faction. Frazier and his party supported state ownership of industries, while the IVA opposed it. A dispute broke out specifically over government ownership of the Bank of North Dakota and State Mill and Elevator.

By September, the campaigners had been able to gather 73,000 names on petitions asking for the recall of Frazier, Attorney General William Lemke, and Commissioner of Agriculture John Hagan. These men made up the Industrial Commission, which acts as a board of directors for the state-owned entities. The date of the recall was set for October 28, 1921.

Results

In the October 28 vote, Ragnvald A. Nestos was elected as governor by a margin of 4,093. He was sworn in on November 23.

See also 
 1978 Cleveland mayoral recall election
 2003 California gubernatorial recall election
 2012 Wisconsin gubernatorial recall election
 2021 California gubernatorial recall election

References 

North Dakota recall
North Dakota recall
History of North Dakota
1921
North Dakota 1921
October 1921 events
Governor of North Dakota